Jayanth may refer to

Jayanth C. Paranjee, Tollywood film director
Chinni Jayanth, Tamil actor
Meg Jayanth, video game creator